Adams in the U.S. state of Wisconsin may refer to:
Adams, Adams County, Wisconsin, a town
Adams, Wisconsin, a city in Adams County
Adams, Green County, Wisconsin, a town
Adams, Jackson County, Wisconsin, a town
Adams, Walworth County, Wisconsin, an unincorporated community
Adams Center, Wisconsin, a ghost town